Carcinarctia laeliodes is a moth of the family Erebidae. It was described by George Hampson in 1916. It is found in the Democratic Republic of the Congo, Kenya and Rwanda.

Subspecies
Carcinarctia laeliodes laeliodes
Carcinarctia laeliodes fasciata Debauche, 1942 (Democratic Republic of the Congo)

References

Spilosomina
Moths described in 1916
Moths of Africa